Crystal Springs Dam is a gravity dam constructed across the San Mateo Creek which is in San Mateo County, California. It impounds water to form the Lower Crystal Springs Reservoir which sits atop the San Andreas Fault in a rift valley created by the fault. The dam itself is located about 300 yards (273 meters) east of the fault.  It was among the first concrete gravity dams built in the western United States. Skyline Boulevard runs over the dam, which also forms the trailhead of the popular Sawyer Camp Trail.

History
The structure was completed in 1888. At the time of its completion, it was the largest concrete structure in the world.

The designer was Hermann Schussler, Chief Engineer of the Spring Valley Water Company.

The dam was constructed by separately pouring large blocks of the structure in place, and allowing them to set before pouring the adjoining blocks. An important design feature is that neither the horizontal nor the vertical joints line up. This helps the structure act as a single monolithic construction despite being made of thousands of individual blocks.

Schussler ensured that each block of the dam was poured with concrete made to the exact proportions of his mix specifications.

In 1976, the dam was designated as a California Historic Civil Engineering Landmark by the American Society of Civil Engineers.

Quake proof

The dam has survived both the 1906 San Francisco earthquake and the 1989 Loma Prieta earthquake – despite its location about 300 yards east of the San Andreas Fault. It was subject to severe shaking in both earthquakes.

Repairs

The San Francisco Public Utilities Commission began the process of renovating the dam in 2003. A major step in the renovation process, doubling the width of the main spillway and raising the dam to increase the water storage capacity, was completed in 2012. The renovations, which are intended to improve the reliability of the system in the event of an earthquake, were completed in 2016. Skyline Boulevard on top of the dam was closed for construction in October 2010. Construction completed in late 2018 and the roadway was reopened in January 2019.

The bridge closed again to vehicular traffic on February 10, 2020, for the Lower Crystal Springs Dam Pond and Parapet Project with an expected completion and re-opening date of April 3, 2020.

See also
 List of dams and reservoirs in California

References

Further reading

External links
 San Francisco Public Utilities Commission
 SFPUC Project Description
 San Mateo County History Museum

Buildings and structures in San Mateo County, California
Dams in California
Hetch Hetchy Project
Dams completed in 1888